Lee Henry Casciaro (born 29 September 1981) is a Gibraltarian footballer who plays as a forward for Lincoln Red Imps and the Gibraltar national team. With 57 club titles with Lincoln Red Imps, he has the record for most titles with one club, most club-titles and most titles in association football. He is also Gibraltar's all-time leading scorer since joining UEFA, with three goals.

Club career
On 7 July 2015, Casciaro scored the winning goal as Lincoln Red Imps came from behind to win 2–1 away to FC Santa Coloma in the UEFA Champions League first qualifying round, advancing on aggregate by the same score to become the first Gibraltarian team to advance into the second qualifying round. On 12 July 2016, he scored the only goal in a 1–0 Red Imps victory over Celtic in the first leg of the 2nd qualifying round of the UEFA Champions League.

On 12 July 2022 he became the oldest player to score in any round of the Champions League or European Cup.  His record-breaking goal came against KF Shkupi in the first qualifying round.

International career
On 7 September 2014, Casciaro made his international debut for Gibraltar in a UEFA Euro 2016 Group D qualifying match against Poland with Gibraltar losing 7–0 at the Estádio Algarve. He had played for the official team since 2007, scoring 9 goals in 7 appearances, but these appearances were considered unofficial upon Gibraltar's entry to UEFA in 2013. On 29 March 2015, he scored Gibraltar's first ever goal in a full international competitive match; netting an equaliser against Scotland in a 6–1 European qualification loss at Hampden Park, Glasgow. For his services to sport in Gibraltar, he was awarded the Gibraltar Medallion of Distinction in August 2019. He captained Gibraltar for the first time against Liechtenstein on 10 October 2020, aged 39.

Personal life
Casciaro is a policeman for the Gibraltar Defence Police. His brothers Kyle and Ryan have also played with Gibraltar's national side.

Career statistics

Scores and results list Gibraltar's goal tally first, score column indicates score after each Casciaro goal.

Honours
Lincoln Red Imps
Gibraltar League (20): 2000–01, 2002–03, 2003–04, 2004–05, 2005–06, 2006–07, 2007–08, 2008–09, 2009–10, 2010–11, 2011–12, 2012–13, 2013–14, 2014–15, 2015–16, 2017–18, 2018–19, 2020–21, 2021–22, 2022–23
Rock Cup (14): 2001–02, 2003–04, 2004–05, 2005–06, 2006–07, 2007–08, 2008–09, 2009–10, 2010–11, 2014, 2015, 2016, 2021, 2021–22
Pepe Reyes Cup (12): 2001, 2002, 2004, 2007, 2008, 2009, 2010, 2011, 2014, 2015, 2017, 2022
Gibraltar League Senior Cup (11): 1999–2000, 2001–02, 2002–03, 2003–04, 2004–05, 2005–06, 2006–07, 2007–08, 2010–11, 2011–12, 2013–14

See also
 List of top international men's football goalscorers by country

References

External links

 
 
 

1981 births
Living people
Gibraltarian footballers
Gibraltar international footballers
Association football forwards
Lincoln Red Imps F.C. players
Police officers
Gibraltar Premier Division players
Gibraltar pre-UEFA international footballers